Keith E. Gubbins (born January 27, 1937) is a British-born American chemical engineer who is the W.H. Clark Distinguished University Professor of Chemical Engineering at North Carolina State University in Raleigh, North Carolina.

Gubbins was elected a member of the National Academy of Engineering in 1989 for pioneering development of computer simulation and perturbation theory for extending statistical mechanical techniques to systems of engineering interest.

Academic Tree 

He has been the supervisor of 47 PhD students and 53 postdoctoral associates, of whom 56 now hold faculty positions in the United States, Europe (Czech Republic, France, Germany, Ireland, Italy, Poland, Portugal, Spain, UK), Asia (Mainland China, Hong Kong (China), India, Japan, Singapore) and Australia, among them Coray Colina and George Jackson, FRS.

References

External links 
[https://gubbins.wordpress.ncsu.edu/ at North Carolina State University

University of Florida alumni
British chemical engineers
Scientists from Southampton
North Carolina State University faculty
1937 births
Living people
Alumni of King's College London